The Argument is a 2020 American drama film, directed by Robert Schwartzman, from a screenplay by Zac Stanford. It stars Maggie Q, Danny Pudi, Cleopatra Coleman, Tyler James Williams, Dan Fogler, and Emma Bell.

It was released on September 4, 2020, by Gravitas Ventures.

Plot

A couple get into an argument while hosting a party. They and their guests later decide to re-create the argument in order to settle their disagreement over how the argument occurred. The four original participants become obsessed with recreating the argument accurately, first by re-enacting it themselves, but when they are unsatisfied by the results, they eventually hire actors to re-enact the incident.

Cast
 Dan Fogler as Jack
 Emma Bell as Lisa
 Danny Pudi as Brett
 Cleopatra Coleman as Trina
 Tyler James Williams as Paul
 Maggie Q as Sarah
 Mark Ryder as Actor Jack
 Karan Brar as Actor Brett
 Marielle Scott as Actor Trina
 Charlotte McKinney as Actor Lisa
 Nathan Stewart-Jarrett as Actor Paul

Production
In May 2019, it was announced Dan Fogler, Emma Bell, Danny Pudi, Cleopatra Coleman, Tyler James Williams, Maggie Q, Mark Ryder, Karan Brar, Marielle Scott, Charlotte McKinney and Nathan Stewart-Jarrett had joined the cast of the film, with Robert Schwartzman directing from a screenplay by Zac Stanford. Production concluded that same month.

Release
In August 2020, Gravitas Ventures acquired distribution rights to the film and set it for September 4, 2020.

Critical reception
On Metacritic, the film holds a rating of 48 out of 100, based on 6 critics, indicating "mixed or average reviews".

References

External links
 

2020 films
2020 drama films
American drama films
Films directed by Robert Schwartzman
2020s English-language films
2020s American films